In Greek mythology, the Titans (hoi Tītânes, ho Tītân) were the pre-Olympian gods. According to the Theogony of Hesiod, they were the twelve children of the primordial parents Uranus (Sky) and Gaia (Earth), with six male Titans—Oceanus, Coeus, Crius, Hyperion, Iapetus, and Cronus—and six female Titans, called the Titanides or "Titanesses" (hai Tītānídes)—Theia, Rhea, Themis, Mnemosyne, Phoebe, and Tethys. Cronus mated with his older sister Rhea, who then bore the first generation of Olympians: the six siblings Zeus, Hades, Poseidon, Hestia, Demeter, and Hera. Certain descendants of the Titans, such as Prometheus, Helios, and Leto, are sometimes also called Titans.

The Titans were the former gods: the generation of gods preceding the Olympians. They were overthrown as part of the Greek succession myth, which tells how Cronus seized power from his father Uranus and ruled the cosmos with his fellow Titans before being in turn defeated and replaced as the ruling pantheon of gods by Zeus and the Olympians in a ten-year war called "the Titanomachy" ( hē Tītānomakhíā). As a result of this war, the vanquished Titans were banished from the upper world and held imprisoned under guard in Tartarus, although apparently some Titans were allowed to remain free.

Genealogy

Hesiod's genealogy 
According to Hesiod, the Titan offspring of Uranus and Gaia were  Oceanus, Coeus, Crius, Hyperion, Iapetus, Theia, Rhea, Themis, Mnemosyne, Phoebe, Tethys, and Cronus. Eight of the Titan brothers and sisters married each other: Oceanus and Tethys, Coeus and Phoebe, Hyperion and Theia, and Cronus and Rhea. The other two Titan brothers married outside their immediate family. Iapetus married his niece Clymene, the daughter of Oceanus and Tethys, while Crius married his half-sister Eurybia, the daughter of Gaia and Pontus. The two remaining Titan sisters, Themis and Mnemosyne, became wives of their nephew Zeus.

From Oceanus and Tethys came the three thousand river gods, and three thousand Oceanid nymphs. From Coeus and Phoebe came Leto, another wife of Zeus, and Asteria.  From Crius and Eurybia came Astraeus, Pallas, and Perses. From Hyperion and Theia came the celestial personifications Helios (Sun), Selene (Moon), and Eos (Dawn). From Iapetus and Clymene came Atlas, Menoetius, Prometheus, and Epimetheus. From Cronus and Rhea came the Olympians: Hestia, Demeter, Hera, Hades, Poseidon, and Zeus. By Zeus, Themis bore the three Horae (Hours), and the three Moirai (Fates), and  Mnemosyne bore the nine Muses.

While the descendants of the Titans Oceanus and Tethys, Cronus and Rhea, Themis, and Mnemosyne (i.e. the river gods, the Oceanids, the Olympians, the Horae, the Moirai, and the Muses) are not normally considered to be Titans, descendants of the other Titans, notably: Leto, Helios, Atlas, and Prometheus, are themselves sometimes referred to as Titans.

Variations

Passages in a section of the  Iliad called the Deception of Zeus suggest the possibility that Homer knew of a tradition in which Oceanus and Tethys (rather than Uranus and Gaia, as in Hesiod) were the parents of the Titans. Twice Homer has Hera describe the pair as "Oceanus, from whom the gods are sprung, and mother Tethys", while in the same passage Hypnos describes Oceanus as "from whom they all are sprung".

Plato, in his Timaeus, provides a genealogy (probably Orphic) which perhaps reflected an attempt to reconcile this apparent divergence between Homer and Hesiod, with Uranus and Gaia as the parents of Oceanus and Tethys, and Oceanus and Tethys as the parents of Cronus and Rhea "and all that go with them", plus Phorcys. In his  Cratylus, Plato quotes Orpheus as saying that Oceanus and Tethys were "the first to marry", possibly also reflecting an Orphic theogony in which Oceanus and Tethys, rather than Uranus and Gaia, were the primeval parents. To Hesiod's twelve Titans, the mythographer Apollodorus, adds a thirteenth Titan, Dione, the mother of Aphrodite by Zeus.  Plato's inclusion of Phorkys, apparently, as a Titan, and the mythographer Apollodorus's inclusion of Dione, suggests an Orphic tradition in which the canonical twelve Titans consisted of Hesiod's twelve with Phorkys and Dione taking the place of Oceanus and Tethys.

The Roman mythographer Hyginus, in his somewhat confused genealogy, after listing as offspring of Aether (Upper Sky) and Earth (Gaia), Ocean [Oceanus], Themis, Tartarus, and Pontus, next lists "the Titans", followed by two of Hesiod's Hundred-Handers: Briareus and Gyges, one of Hesiod's three Cyclopes: Steropes, then continues his list with Atlas, Hyperion and Polus, Saturn [Cronus], Ops [Rhea], Moneta, Dione, and the three Furies: Alecto, Megaera, and Tisiphone. The geographer Pausanias, mentions seeing the image of a man in armor, who was supposed to be the Titan Anytos, who was said to have raised the Arcadian Despoina.

Former gods
The Titans, as a group, represent a pre-Olympian order. Hesiod uses the expression "the former gods" in reference to the Titans. They were the banished gods, who were no longer part of the upper world. Rather they were the gods who dwelt underground in Tartarus,  and as such, they may have been thought of as "gods of the underworld", who were the antithesis of, and in opposition to, the Olympians, the gods of the heavens. Hesiod called the Titans "earth-born" (chthonic), and in the Homeric Hymn to Apollo, Hera prays to the Titans "who dwell beneath the earth", calling on them to aid her against Zeus, just as if they were chthonic spirits. In a similar fashion, in the Iliad, Hera, upon swearing an oath by the underworld river Styx, "invoked by name all the gods below Tartarus, that are called Titans" as witnesses.

They were the older gods, but not, apparently, as was once thought, the old gods of an indigenous group in Greece, historically displaced by the new gods of Greek invaders. Rather, they were a group of gods, whose mythology at least, seems to have been borrowed from the Near East (see "Near East origins," below). These imported gods gave context and provided a backstory for the Olympian gods, explaining where these Greek Olympian gods had come from, and how they had come to occupy their position of supremacy in the cosmos. The Titans were the previous generation, and family of gods, whom the Olympians had to overthrow, and banish from the upper world, in order to become the ruling pantheon of Greek gods.

For Hesiod, possibly in order to match the twelve Olympian gods, there were twelve Titans: six males and six females, with some of Hesiod's names perhaps being mere poetic inventions, so as to arrive at the right number. In Hesiod's Theogony, apart from Cronus, the Titans play no part at all in the overthrow of Uranus, and we only hear of their collective action in the Titanomachy, their war with the Olympians. As a group, they have no further role in conventional Greek myth, nor do they play any part in Greek cult.

As individuals, few of the Titans have any separate identity. Aside from Cronus, the only other figure Homer mentions by name as being a Titan is Iapetus. Some Titans seem only to serve a genealogical function, providing parents for more important offspring: Coeus and Phoebe as the parents of Leto, the mother, by Zeus, of the Olympians Apollo and Artemis; Hyperion and Theia as the parents of Helios, Selene and Eos; Iapetus as the father of Atlas and Prometheus; and Crius as the father of three sons Astraeus, Pallas, and Perses, who themselves seem only to exist to provide fathers for more important figures such as the Anemoi (Winds), Nike (Victory), and Hecate.

Overthrown
The Titans play a key role in an important part of Greek mythology, the succession myth. It told how the Titan Cronus, the youngest of the Titans, overthrew Uranus, and how in turn Zeus, by waging and winning a great ten-year war pitting the new gods against the old gods, called the Titanomachy ("Titan war"), overthrew Cronus and his fellow Titans, and was eventually established as the final and permanent ruler of the cosmos.

Hesiod

According to the standard version of the succession myth, given in Hesiod's Theogony, Uranus initially produced eighteen children with Gaia: the twelve Titans, the three Cyclopes, and the three Hecatoncheires (Hundred-Handers), but hating them, he hid them away somewhere inside Gaia. Angry and in distress, Gaia fashioned a sickle made of adamant and urged her children to punish their father. Only her son Cronus was willing. So Gaia hid Cronus in "ambush", gave him an adamantine sickle, and when Uranus came to lie with Gaia, Cronus reached out and castrated his father. This enabled the Titans to be born and Cronus to assume supreme command of the cosmos, with the Titans as his subordinates.

Cronus, having now taken over control of the cosmos from Uranus, wanted to ensure that he maintained control. Uranus and Gaia had prophesied to Cronus that one of Cronus' own children would overthrow him, so when Cronus married Rhea, he made sure to swallow each of the children she birthed. This he did with the first five: Hestia, Demeter, Hera, Hades, Poseidon (in that order), to Rhea's great sorrow. However, when Rhea was  pregnant with Zeus, Rhea begged her parents Gaia and Uranus to help her save Zeus. So they sent Rhea to Lyctus on Crete to bear Zeus, and Gaia took the newborn Zeus to raise, hiding him deep in a cave beneath Mount Aigaion. Meanwhile, Rhea gave Cronus a huge stone wrapped in baby's clothes which he swallowed thinking that it was another of Rhea's children.

Zeus, now grown, forced Cronus (using some unspecified trickery of Gaia) to disgorge his other five children. Zeus then released his uncles the Cyclopes (apparently still imprisoned beneath the earth, along with the Hundred-Handers, where Uranus had originally confined them) who then provide Zeus with his great weapon, the thunderbolt, which had been hidden by Gaia. A great war was begun, the Titanomachy, for control of the cosmos. The Titans fought from Mount Othrys, while the Olympians fought from Mount Olympus. In the tenth year of that great war, following Gaia's counsel, Zeus released the Hundred-Handers, who joined the war against the Titans, helping Zeus to gain the upper hand. Zeus cast the fury of his thunderbolt at the Titans, defeating them and throwing them into Tartarus, with the Hundred-Handers as their guards.

Homer
Only brief references to the Titans and the succession myth are found in Homer. In the Iliad, Homer tells us that "the gods ... that are called Titans" reside in Tartarus. Specifically, Homer says that "Iapetus and Cronos ... have joy neither in the rays of Helios Hyperion [the Sun] nor in any breeze, but deep Tartarus is round about them", and further, that Zeus "thrust Cronos down to dwell beneath earth and the unresting sea."

Other early sources
Brief mentions of the Titanomachy and the imprisonment of the Titans in Tartarus also occur in the Homeric Hymn to Apollo and Aeschylus' Prometheus Bound. 
In the Hymn, Hera, angry at Zeus, calls upon the "Titan gods who dwell beneath the earth about great Tartarus, and from whom are sprung both gods and men".

In Prometheus Bound, Prometheus (the son of the Titan Iapetus) refers to the Titanomachy, and his part in it:

Apollodorus
The mythographer Apollodorus, gives a similar account of the succession myth to Hesiod's, but with a few significant differences. According to Apollodorus, there were thirteen original Titans, adding the Titaness Dione to Hesiod's list. The Titans (instead of being Uranus' firstborn as in Hesiod) were born after  the three Hundred-Handers and the three Cyclopes, and while Uranus imprisoned these first six of his offspring, he apparently left the Titans free. Not just Cronus, but all the Titans, except Oceanus, attacked Uranus. After Cronus castrated Uranus, the Titans freed the Hundred-Handers and Cyclopes (unlike in Hesiod, where they apparently remained imprisoned), and made Cronus their sovereign, who then reimprisoned the Hundred-Handers and Cyclopes in Tartarus.

Although Hesiod does not say how Zeus was eventually able to free his siblings, according to Apollodorus, Zeus was aided by Oceanus' daughter Metis, who gave Cronus an emetic which forced him to disgorge his children that he had swallowed. According to Apollodorus, in the tenth year of the ensuing war, Zeus learned from Gaia, that he would be victorious if he had the Hundred-Handers and the Cyclopes as allies. So Zeus slew their warder Campe (a detail not found in Hesiod) and released them, and in addition to giving Zeus his thunderbolt (as in Hesiod), the Cyclopes also gave Poseidon his trident, and Hades a helmet, and "with these weapons the gods overcame the Titans, shut them up in Tartarus, and appointed the Hundred-handers their guards".

Hyginus
The Roman mythographer Hyginus, in his Fabulae, gives an unusual (and perhaps confused) account of the Titanomachy. According to Hyginus the Titanomachy came about because of a dispute between Jupiter and Juno (the Roman equivalents of Zeus and Hera). Juno, Jupiter's jealous wife, was angry at her husband, on account of Jupiter's son Epaphus by Io (one of her husband's many lovers). Because of this Juno incited the Titans to rebel against Jupiter and restore Saturn (Cronus) to the kingship of the gods. Jupiter, with the help of Minerva (Athena), Apollo, and Diana (Artemis), put down the rebellion, and hurled the Titans (as in other accounts) down to Tartarus.

After the Titanomachy

After being overthrown in the Titanomachy, Cronus and his fellow vanquished Titans were cast into Tartarus:

However, besides Cronus, exactly which of the other Titans were supposed to have been imprisoned in Tartarus is unclear. The only original Titan, mentioned by name, as being confined with Cronus in Tartarus, is Iapetus.

But, not all the Titans were imprisoned there. Certainly Oceanus, the great world encircling river, seems to have remained free, and in fact, seems not to have fought on the Titans' side at all.  In Hesiod, Oceanus sends his daughter Styx, with her children Zelus (Envy), Nike (Victory), Kratos (Power), and Bia (Force), to fight on Zeus' side against the Titans, while in the Iliad, Hera says that, during the Titanomachy, she was cared for by Oceanus and his wife the Titaness Tethys. Aeschylus' Prometheus Bound, has Oceanus free to visit his nephew Prometheus sometime after the war. Like Oceanus, Helios, the Titan son of Hyperion, certainly remained free to drive his sun-chariot daily across the sky, taking an active part in events subsequent to the Titanomachy. The freedom of Oceanus, along with Helios (Sun), and perhaps Hyperion (to the extent that he also represented the Sun), would seem to be the result of cosmological necessity, for how could a world encircling river, or the Sun, be confined in Tartarus?

As for other male offspring of the Titans, some seem to have participated in the Titanomachy, and were punished as a result, and others did not, or at least (like Helios) remained free. Three of Iapetus' sons, Atlas, Menoetius, and Prometheus are specifically connected by ancient sources with the war. In the Theogony both Atlas and Menoetius  received punishments from Zeus, but Hesiod does not say for what crime exactly they were punished. Atlas was famously punished by Zeus, by being forced to hold up the sky on his shoulders, but none of the early sources for this story (Hesiod, Homer, Pindar, and Aeschylus) say that his punishment was as a result of the war. According to Hyginus however, Atlas led the Titans in a revolt against Zeus (Jupiter). The Theogony has Menoetius struck down by Zeus' thunderbolt and cast into Erebus "because of his mad presumption and exceeding pride". Whether Hesiod was using Erebus as another name for Tartarus (as was sometimes done), or meant that Menoetius's punishment was because of his participation in the Titanomachy is unclear, and no other early source mentions this event, however Apollodorus says that it was. Hesiod does not mention Prometheus in connection with the Titanomachy, but Prometheus does remain free, in the Theogony, for his deception of Zeus at Mecone and his subsequent theft of fire, for which transgressions Prometheus was famously punished by Zeus by being chained to a rock where an eagle came to eat his "immortal liver" every day, which then grew back every night. However Aeschylus's Prometheus Bound  (as mentioned above) does have Prometheus say that he was an ally of Zeus during the Titanomachy.

The female Titans, to the extent that they are mentioned at all, appear also to have been allowed to remain free. Three of these, according to the Theogony, become wives of Zeus: Themis, Mnemosyne, and Leto, the daughter of the Titans Coeus and Phoebe. Themis gives birth to the three Horae (Hours), and the three Moirai (Fates), and Mnemosyne gives birth to the nine Muses. Leto, who gives birth to the Olympians Apollo and Artemis, takes an active part on the side of the Trojans in the Iliad, and is also involved in the story of the giant Tityos. Tethys, presumably along with her husband Oceanus, took no part in the war, and, as mentioned above, provided safe refuge for Hera during the war. Rhea remains free and active after the war: appearing at Leto's delivery of Apollo, as Zeus' messenger to Demeter announcing the settlement concerning Persephone, bringing Pelops back to life.

Possible release
While in Hesiod's Theogony, and Homer's Iliad, Cronus and the other Titans are confined to Tartarus—apparently forever—another tradition, as indicated by later sources, seems to have had Cronus, or other of the Titans, being eventually set free. Pindar, in one of his poems (462 BC), says that, although Atlas still "strains against the weight of the sky ... Zeus freed the Titans", and in another poem (476 BC), Pindar has Cronus, in fact, ruling in the Isles of the Blessed, a land where the Greek heroes reside in the afterlife:

Prometheus Lyomenos, an undated lost play by Aeschylus (c. 525 – c. 455 BC), had a chorus composed of freed Titans. Possibly even earlier than Pindar and Aeschylus, two papyrus versions of a passage of Hesiods' Works and Days also mention Cronus being released by Zeus, and ruling over the heroes who go to the Isle of the Blessed; but other versions of Hesiod's text do not, and most editors judge these lines of text to be later interpolations.

Near East origins

It is generally accepted that the Greek succession myth was imported from the Near East, and that along with this imported myth came stories of a group of former ruling gods, who had been defeated and displaced, and who became identified, by the Greeks, as the Titans. Features of Hesiod's account of the Titans can be seen in the stories of the Hurrians, the Hittites, the Babylonians, and other Near Eastern cultures.

The Hurro-Hittite text Song of Kumarbi (also called Kingship in Heaven), written five hundred years before Hesiod, tells of a succession of kings in heaven: Anu (Sky), Kumarbi, and the storm-god Teshub, with many striking parallels to Hesiod's account of the Greek succession myth. Like Cronus, Kumarbi castrates the sky-god Anu, and takes over his kingship. And like Cronus, Kumarbi swallows gods (and a stone?), one of whom is the storm-god Teshub, who like the storm-god Zeus, is apparently victorious against Kumarbi and others in a war of the gods.

Other Hittite texts contain allusions to "former gods", precisely what Hesiod called the Titans, .  Like the Titans, these Hittite , were twelve (usually) in number and end up confined in the underworld by the storm-god Teshub, imprisoned by gates they cannot open. In Hurrian, the Hittite's  were known as the "gods of down under" and the Hittites identified these gods with the Anunnaki, the Babylonian gods of the underworld, whose defeat and imprisonment by the storm-god Marduk, in the Babylonian poem Enûma Eliš (late second millennium BC or earlier), parallels the defeat and imprisonment of the Titans. Other collectivities of gods, perhaps associated with the Mesopotamian Anunnaki, include the  Dead Gods (Dingiruggû), the Banished Gods (ilāni darsūti), and the Defeated (or Bound) Gods (ilāni kamûti).

Orphic literature

The sparagmos

In Orphic literature, the Titans play an important role in what is often considered to be the central myth of Orphism, the sparagmos, that is the dismemberment of Dionysus, who in this context is often given the title Zagreus. As pieced together from various ancient sources, the reconstructed story, usually given by modern scholars, goes as follows. Zeus had intercourse with Persephone in the form of a serpent, producing Dionysus. He is taken to Mount Ida where (like the infant Zeus) he is guarded by the dancing Curetes. Zeus intended Dionysus to be his successor as ruler of the cosmos, but a jealous Hera incited the Titans—who apparently unlike in Hesiod and Homer, were not imprisoned in Tartarus—to kill the child. The Titans whiten their faces with gypsum, and distracting the infant Dionysus with various toys, including a mirror, they seized Dionysus and tore (or cut) him to pieces. The pieces were then boiled, roasted and partially eaten, by the Titans. But Athena managed to save Dionysus' heart, by which Zeus was able to contrive his rebirth from Semele.

The anthropogony
Commonly presented as a part of the myth of the dismembered Dionysus Zagreus, is an Orphic anthropogony, that is an Orphic account of the origin of human beings. According to this widely held view, as punishment for their crime, Zeus struck the Titans with his thunderbolt, and from the remains of the destroyed Titans humankind was born, which resulted in a human inheritance of ancestral guilt, for this original sin of the Titans, and by some accounts "formed the basis for an Orphic doctrine of the divinity of man." However, when and to what extent there existed any Orphic tradition which included these elements is the subject of open debate.

The 2nd century AD biographer and essayist Plutarch makes a connection between the sparagmos and the punishment of the Titans, but makes no mention of the anthropogony, or Orpheus, or Orphism. In his essay On the Eating of Flesh, Plutarch writes of "stories told about the sufferings and dismemberment of Dionysus and the outrageous assaults of the Titans upon him, and their punishment and blasting by thunderbolt after they had tasted his blood". While, according to the early 4th century AD Christian apologist Arnobius, and the 5th century AD Greek epic poet Nonnus, it is as punishment for their murder of Dionysus that the Titans end up imprisoned by Zeus in Tartarus.

The only ancient source to explicitly connect the sparagmos and the anthropogony is the 6th century AD Neoplatonist Olympiodorus, who writes that, according to Orpheus, after the Titans had dismembered and eaten Dionysus, "Zeus, angered by the deed, blasts them with his thunderbolts, and from the sublimate of the vapors that rise from them comes the matter from which men are created." Olympiodorus goes on to conclude that, because the Titans had eaten his flesh, we their descendants, are a part of Dionysus.

Modern interpretations
Some 19th- and 20th-century scholars, including Jane Ellen Harrison, have argued that an initiatory or shamanic ritual underlies the myth of the dismemberment and cannibalism of Dionysus by the Titans. Martin Litchfield West also asserts this in relation to shamanistic initiatory rites of early Greek religious practices.

Etymology
The etymology of Τiτᾶνες (Titanes) is uncertain. Hesiod in the Theogony gives a double etymology, deriving it from  [to strain] and  [vengeance], saying that Uranus gave them the name Titans: "in reproach, for he said that they strained and did presumptuously a fearful deed, and that vengeance for it would come afterwards". But modern scholars doubt Hesiod's etymology.

Jane Ellen Harrison asserts that the word "Titan" comes from the Greek τίτανος, signifying white "earth, clay, or gypsum," and that the Titans were "white clay men", or men covered by white clay or gypsum dust in their rituals.

In astronomy
The planet Saturn is named for the Roman equivalent of the Titan Cronus. Saturn's largest moon, Titan, is named after the Titans generally, and the other moons of Saturn are named after individual Titans, specifically Tethys, Phoebe, Rhea, Hyperion, and Iapetus. Astronomer William Henry Pickering claimed to have discovered another moon of Saturn which he named Themis, but this discovery was never confirmed, and the name Themis was given to an asteroid, 24 Themis. Asteroid 57 Mnemosyne was also named for the Titan.

A proto-planet Theia is hypothesized to have been involved in a collision in the early solar system, forming the Earth's moon.

In popular culture

See also
Annunaki
Asura
Cyclopes
Elohim
Greek primordial deities
Hecatoncheires
Jötunn
Vanir

Notes

References
 Aeschylus, Prometheus Bound in Aeschylus, with an English translation by Herbert Weir Smyth, Ph. D. in two volumes. Vol 2. Cambridge, Massachusetts, Harvard University Press. 1926. Online version at the Perseus Digital Library.
 Aeschylus, Persians. Seven against Thebes. Suppliants. Prometheus Bound. Edited and translated by Alan H. Sommerstein. Loeb Classical Library No. 145. Cambridge, Massachusetts: Harvard University Press, 2009. . Online version at Harvard University Press.
 Apollodorus, Apollodorus, The Library, with an English Translation by Sir James George Frazer, F.B.A., F.R.S. in 2 Volumes. Cambridge, Massachusetts, Harvard University Press; London, William Heinemann Ltd. 1921. Online version at the Perseus Digital Library.
 Apollonius Rhodius, Argonautica, edited and translated by William H. Race, Loeb Classical Library No. 1, Cambridge, Massachusetts, Harvard University Press, 2009. . Online version at Harvard University Press.
 Archi, Alsonso, "The Names of the Primeval Gods", Orientalia, Nova Series, Vol. 59, No. 2, Die Artikel in diesem Heft sind Einar von Schuler gewidmet (*28. 10. 1930 †15. 2. 1990) (1990), pp. 114–29. .
 Arnobius, The Seven Books of Arnobius Adversus Gentes,  translated by Archibald Hamilton Bryce and Hugh Campbell, Edinburg: T. & T. Clark. 1871. Internet Archive.
 Athanassakis, Apostolos N., and Benjamin M. Wolkow, The Orphic Hymns, Johns Hopkins University Press, 2013) . Google Books.
 Beckman, Gary, "Intrinsic and Constructed Sacred Space in Hittite Anatolia" in Heaven on Earth: Temples, Ritual and Cosmic Symbolism in the Ancient World, edited by Deena Ragavan, Oriental Institute of the University of Chicago, Number 9, 2013, pp. 153–173.
 Bernabé, Alberto (2002), "La toile de Pénélope: a-t-il existé un mythe orphique sur Dionysos et les Titans?" Revue de l'histoire des religions 219(4): 401–433.
 Bernabé, Alberto (2003), "Autour du mythe orphique sur Dionysos et les Titans. Quelque notes critiques" in Des Géants à Dionysos. Mélanges offerts à F. Vian. D. A. P. Chuvin. Alessandria: 25–39.
 Bremmer, Jan N., Greek Religion and Culture, the Bible, and the Ancient Near East, Brill, 2008. .
 Burkert, Walter (1985), Greek Religion, Harvard University Press, 1985. .
 Burkert, Walter (1995), The Orientalizing Revolution: Near Eastern Influence on Greek Culture in the Early Archaic Age, translated by Walter Burkert, Margaret E. Pinder, Harvard University Press, 1995. .
 Caldwell, Richard, Hesiod's Theogony, Focus Publishing/R. Pullins Company (1987). .
 Campbell, David A., Greek Lyric, Volume IV: Bacchylides, Corinna,  Loeb Classical Library No. 461. Cambridge, Massachusetts, Harvard University Press. . Online version at Harvard University Press.
 Clement of Alexandria, The Exhortation to the Greeks. The Rich Man's Salvation. To the Newly Baptized. Translated by G. W. Butterworth. Loeb Classical Library No. 92. Cambridge, Massachusetts: Harvard University Press, 1919. . Online version at Harvard University Press.  Internet Archive 1960 edition.
 Diodorus Siculus, Library of History, Volume III: Books 4.59-8. Translated by C. H. Oldfather. Loeb Classical Library No. 340. Cambridge, Massachusetts: Harvard University Press, 1939. . Online version at Harvard University Press. Online version by Bill Thayer
 Edmonds, Radcliffe (1999), "Tearing Apart the Zagreus Myth: A Few Disparaging Remarks On Orphism and Original Sin", Classical Antiquity 18 (1999): 35–73. PDF.
 Edmonds, Radcliffe (2008), "Recycling Laertes' Shroud: More on Orphism and Original Sin", Center for Hellenic Studies
 Edmonds, Radcliffe (2013), Redefining Ancient Orphism: A Study in Greek Religion, Cambridge; New York:  Cambridge University Press. .
 Fowler, R. L. (2000), Early Greek Mythography: Volume 1: Text and Introduction, Oxford University Press, 2000. .
 Fowler, R. L. (2013), Early Greek Mythography: Volume 2: Commentary, Oxford University Press, 2013. .
 Gantz, Timothy, Early Greek Myth: A Guide to Literary and Artistic Sources, Johns Hopkins University Press, 1996, Two volumes:  (Vol. 1),  (Vol. 2).
 Guthrie, W. K. C., Orpheus and Greek Religion: A Study of the Orphic Movement, Princeton University Press, 1935. .
 Grimal, Pierre, The Dictionary of Classical Mythology, Wiley-Blackwell, 1996. .
 Hansen, William, Handbook of Classical Mythology, ABC-CLIO, 2004. .
 Hard, Robin, The Routledge Handbook of Greek Mythology: Based on H.J. Rose's "Handbook of Greek Mythology", Psychology Press, 2004, . Google Books.
 Harrison, Jane Ellen, Prolegomena to the Study of Greek Religion, second edition, Cambridge: Cambridge University Press, 1908. Internet Archive
 Hesiod, Theogony, in The Homeric Hymns and Homerica with an English Translation by Hugh G. Evelyn-White, Cambridge, Massachusetts, Harvard University Press; London, William Heinemann Ltd. 1914. Online version at the Perseus Digital Library.
 Hesiod; Works and Days, in The Homeric Hymns and Homerica with an English Translation by Hugh G. Evelyn-White, Cambridge, Massachusetts, Harvard University Press; London, William Heinemann Ltd. 1914. Online version at the Perseus Digital Library.
 Homer, The Iliad with an English Translation by A.T. Murray, Ph.D. in two volumes. Cambridge, Massachusetts, Harvard University Press; London, William Heinemann, Ltd. 1924. Online version at the Perseus Digital Library.
 Homeric Hymn to Apollo (3), in The Homeric Hymns and Homerica with an English Translation by Hugh G. Evelyn-White, Cambridge, Massachusetts, Harvard University Press; London, William Heinemann Ltd. 1914. Online version at the Perseus Digital Library.
 Homeric Hymn to Demeter (2), in The Homeric Hymns and Homerica with an English Translation by Hugh G. Evelyn-White, Cambridge, Massachusetts, Harvard University Press; London, William Heinemann Ltd. 1914. Online version at the Perseus Digital Library.
 Homeric Hymn to Hermes (4), in The Homeric Hymns and Homerica with an English Translation by Hugh G. Evelyn-White, Cambridge, Massachusetts, Harvard University Press; London, William Heinemann Ltd. 1914. Online version at the Perseus Digital Library.
 Hyginus, Gaius Julius, Fabulae in Apollodorus' Library and Hyginus' Fabulae: Two Handbooks of Greek Mythology, Translated, with Introductions by R. Scott Smith and Stephen M. Trzaskoma, Hackett Publishing Company,  2007. .
 Kern, Otto. Orphicorum Fragmenta, Berlin, 1922. Internet Archive
 Linforth, Ivan M., The Arts of Orpheus, Berkeley, University of California Press, 1941. Online version at HathiTrust
 March, Jenny, Cassell's Dictionary of Classical Mythology, Casell & Co, 2001. . Internet Archive
 Morford, Mark P. O., Robert J. Lenardon, Classical Mythology, Eighth Edition, Oxford University Press, 2007. .
 Most, G.W., Hesiod, Theogony, Works and Days, Testimonia, Edited and translated by Glenn W. Most, Loeb Classical Library No. 57, Cambridge, Massachusetts, Harvard University Press, 2018. . Online version at Harvard University Press.
 Nilsson, Martin, P., "Early Orphism and Kindred Religions Movements", The Harvard Theological Review, Vol. 28, No. 3 (Jul., 1935), pp. 181–230. 
 Nonnus, Dionysiaca; translated by Rouse, W H D, I Books I–XV. Loeb Classical Library No. 344, Cambridge, Massachusetts, Harvard University Press; London, William Heinemann Ltd. 1940. Internet Archive
 Ogden, Daniel, Drakōn: Dragon Myth and Serpent Cult in the Greek and Roman Worlds, Oxford University Press, 2013. .
 Ovid, Metamorphoses, Brookes More. Boston. Cornhill Publishing Co. 1922. Online version at the Perseus Digital Library.
 Parada, Carlos, Genealogical Guide to Greek Mythology, Jonsered, Paul Åströms Förlag, 1993. .
 Parker, Robert (2002), "Early Orphism" in The Greek World, edited by Anton Powell, Routledge, 2002. .
 Parker, Robert (2014), Review of Edmonds 2013. Bryn Mawr Classical Review BMCR 2014.07.13.
 Pausanias, Pausanias Description of Greece with an English Translation by W.H.S. Jones, Litt.D., and H.A. Ormerod, M.A., in 4 Volumes. Cambridge, Massachusetts, Harvard University Press; London, William Heinemann Ltd. 1918. Online version at the Perseus Digital Library.
 Pindar, Odes, Diane Arnson Svarlien. 1990. Online version at the Perseus Digital Library.
 Plato, Cratylus in Plato in Twelve Volumes, Vol. 12 translated by Harold N. Fowler, Cambridge, Massachusetts, Harvard University Press; London, William Heinemann Ltd. 1925. Online version at the Perseus Digital Library.
 Plato, Critias in Plato in Twelve Volumes, Vol. 9 translated by W.R.M. Lamb. Cambridge, Massachusetts, Harvard University Press; London, William Heinemann Ltd. 1925. Online version at the Perseus Digital Library.
 Plato, Timaeus in Plato in Twelve Volumes, Vol. 9 translated by W.R.M. Lamb. Cambridge, Massachusetts, Harvard University Press; London, William Heinemann Ltd. 1925. Online version at the Perseus Digital Library.
 Plutarch, Moralia, Volume XII: Concerning the Face Which Appears in the Orb of the Moon. On the Principle of Cold. Whether Fire or Water Is More Useful. Whether Land or Sea Animals Are Cleverer. Beasts Are Rational. On the Eating of Flesh. Translated by Harold Cherniss, W. C. Helmbold. Loeb Classical Library No. 406. Cambridge, Massachusetts: Harvard University Press, 1957.  Online version at Harvard University Press.
 Rutherford, Ian, "Canonizing the Pantheon: the Dodekatheon in Greek Religion and its Origins" in The Gods of Ancient Greece: Identities and Transformations, editors Jan N. Bremmer, Andrew Erskine, Edinburgh University Press 2010. .
 Spineto, Natale, "Models of the Relationship between God and Huma in 'Paganism', in The Quest for a Common Humanity: Human Dignity and Otherness in the Religious Traditions of the Mediterranean, Brill, 2011. .
 Rose, H. J., s.v. Atlas, s.v. Leto, s.v. Prometheus, s.v. Titan, in  The Oxford Classical Dictionary, Hammond, N.G.L. and Howard Hayes Scullard (editors), second edition, Oxford University Press, 1992. .
 Smith, William; Dictionary of Greek and Roman Biography and Mythology, London (1873). Online version at the Perseus Digital Library
 Tripp, Edward, Crowell's Handbook of Classical Mythology, Thomas Y. Crowell Co; First edition (June 1970). .
 West, M. L. (1966), Hesiod: Theogony, Oxford University Press. .
 West, M. L. (1978), Hesiod: Works and Days, Clarendon Press. .
 West, M. L. (1983), The Orphic Poems, Clarendon Press. .
 West, M. L. (1988), Hesiod: Theogony and Works and Days, Oxford University Press. .
 West, M. L. (1997), The East Face of Helicon: West Asiatic Elements in Greek Poetry and Myth, Oxford University Press. .
 West, M. L. (2007), Indo-European Poetry and Myth, OUP Oxford, 2007, .
 Woodard, Roger D., "Hesiod and Greek Myth" in The Cambridge Companion to Greek Mythology, edited by Roger Woodard, Cambridge University Press, 2007. .

External links 
 
 

 
Greek legendary creatures
Characters in Book VI of the Aeneid
Condemned souls in Tartarus
Children of Gaia
Deeds of Zeus
Types of deities